Epermenia ochreomaculellus is a moth of the family Epermeniidae. It is found from the Iberian Peninsula to Bulgaria and the Caucasus, as well as from Lebanon to Mongolia.

Subspecies
Epermenia ochreomaculellus ochreomaculellus (Iberian Peninsula to Bulgaria and the Caucasus)
Epermenia ochreomaculellus asiatica Gaedike, 1979 (Near East: Lebanon to Mongolia)

References

Moths described in 1854
Epermeniidae
Moths of Europe
Moths of Asia